Lightning Force is an American action television series starring Matthew Walker, Wings Hauser and Guylaine St-Onge that aired in syndication. The series premiered in 1991 and went off in 1992, in all 22 episodes were produced.

Synopsis
Lightning Force was an elite military team formed by members of the International Oversight Committee for Anti-Terrorism. Each team member had special skills that helped them on their missions.

Cast
 Wings Hauser as LT. Col Matthew 'Trane' Coltrane
 Marc Gomes as Col. Zaid 'Zeke' Abdul-Rahmad
 Guylaine St-Onge as Marie 'Joan' Jacquard
 David Stratton as LT. Winston Churchill 'Church' Staples
 Matthew Walker as Maj. Gen Bill McHugh

References

External links
 
 

1991 American television series debuts
1992 American television series endings
American military television series
English-language television shows
Espionage television series
Television series by CBS Studios